Timothy D. Leonard (born 1940) is a senior United States district judge of the United States District Court for the Western District of Oklahoma.

Education and career

Born in Beaver, Oklahoma, Leonard received a Bachelor of Arts degree from the University of Oklahoma in 1962 and a Juris Doctor from the University of Oklahoma College of Law in 1965. He was in the United States Navy Lieutenant Commander, JAG Corps from 1965 to 1968. He was a United States Naval Reserve Lieutenant from 1968 to 1972. He was an assistant state attorney general of Oklahoma from 1969 to 1971. He was in private practice in Oklahoma City in 1971. He was in private practice in Beaver from 1971 to 1988. He was a member of the Oklahoma State Senate from 1979 to 1988. He was a minority floor leader from 1985 to 1986. He was in private practice in Oklahoma City from 1988 to 1989. He was a guest lecturer and adjunct professor, Oklahoma City University from 1988 to 1989. He was the United States Attorney for the Western District of Oklahoma from 1989 to 1992.

Federal judicial service

Leonard was nominated by President George H. W. Bush on November 20, 1991, to a seat on the United States District Court for the Western District of Oklahoma vacated by Judge Layn R. Phillips. He was confirmed by the United States Senate on August 11, 1992, and received his commission on August 12, 1992. He assumed senior status on August 21, 2006.

Further reading
Leonard is the subject of a book co-authored by Oklahoma City attorney, Bob Burke, and federal district judge Joe L. Heaton. The book is Tim Leonard: Son of the Panhandle (Oklahoma Hall of Fame Publishing, 2023).

References

Sources
 

1940 births
Living people
Judges of the United States District Court for the Western District of Oklahoma
Oklahoma City University faculty
Republican Party Oklahoma state senators
People from Beaver County, Oklahoma
United States Attorneys for the Western District of Oklahoma
United States district court judges appointed by George H. W. Bush
20th-century American judges
United States Navy officers
University of Oklahoma alumni
University of Oklahoma College of Law alumni
21st-century American judges